Oussama Hosni (born 17 September 1992) is a Tunisian handball player for RK Eurofarm Pelister and the Tunisian national team.

He participated on the Tunisia national team at the 2016 Summer Olympics in Rio de Janeiro, in the men's handball tournament.

References

External links

1992 births
Living people
Tunisian male handball players
Olympic handball players of Tunisia
Handball players at the 2016 Summer Olympics
Expatriate handball players
Tunisian expatriate sportspeople in France
Competitors at the 2018 Mediterranean Games
Mediterranean Games silver medalists for Tunisia
Mediterranean Games medalists in handball
21st-century Tunisian people